Munditia tryphenensis is a species of minute sea snail, a marine gastropod mollusc in the family Liotiidae.

Distribution
This endemic marine species occurs in New Zealand's North Island.

References

 Powell A. W. B., New Zealand Mollusca, William Collins Publishers Ltd, Auckland, New Zealand 1979 

tryphenensis
Gastropods of New Zealand
Gastropods described in 1926